The Drummer soil series is the state soil of Illinois.

It was established in Ford County, Illinois, in 1929. Drummer Soil was named for Drummer Creek in Drummer Township. These soils formed under prairie vegetation. 

Drummer soil is the most abundant and extensive soil in Illinois. It is the most productive soil in the state. Corn and soybeans are the principal crops grown in Drummer soil. 

Drummer is a fine-silty, mixed, superactive, mesic Typic Endoaquoll. This taxonomic classification is characteristic of the wet, dark-colored, prairie-derived soils of Illinois.

See also
Pedology (soil study)
Soil types
List of U.S. state soils

References 

Pedology
Soil in the United States
Geology of Illinois
Types of soil
Symbols of Illinois